A  is a list of kigo (seasonal terms) used in haiku and related forms of poetry. An entry in a saijiki usually includes a description of the kigo itself, as well as a list of similar or related words, and some examples of haiku that include that kigo. A  is similar, but does not contain sample poems. Modern saijiki and kiyose are divided into the four seasons and New Year, with some containing a further section for  topics. Each seasonal section is further divided into a standard set of categories, each containing a list of relevant kigo. The most common categories are:
 The season
 The heavens
 The earth
 Humanity
 Observances
 Animals
 Plants

Japanese seasons
In the Japanese calendar, seasons traditionally followed the lunisolar calendar with the solstices and equinoxes at the middle of a season. The traditional Japanese seasons are:
 Spring: 4 February–5 May
 Summer: 6 May–7 August
 Autumn: 8 August–6 November
 Winter: 7 November–3 February

In categorising kigo, a saijiki or kiyose divides each season into early, middle, and late periods, as follows:

 Early spring: 4 February–5 March
 Mid-spring: 6 March–4 April
 Late spring: 5 April–5 May
 Early summer: 6 May–5 June
 Mid-summer: 6 June–6 July
 Late summer: 7 July–7 August
 Early autumn: 8 August–7 September
 Mid-autumn: 8 September–7 October
 Late autumn: 8 October–6 November
 Early winter: 7 November–6 December
 Mid-winter: 7 December–4 January
 Late winter: 5 January–3 February

Examples of saijiki and kiyose

English
 The Five Hundred Essential Japanese Season Words, selected by Kenkichi Yamamoto, on Renku Home
 William J. Higginson, ed. Haiku world: an international poetry almanac. Kodansha, 1996. 
 The Japanese Haiku Topical Dictionary at the University of Virginia Japanese Text Initiative
 World Kigo Database, worldwide saijiki

Japanese
 Masaoka Shiki, ed. Kiyose. 1930
 Kyoshi Takahama, ed. A New Saijiki, 1934
 Teiko Inahata, ed. The New Hototogisu Saijiki, 1996

References

External links
 Le Saijiki en français by Seegan Mabesoone

See also
 Haiku in English
 List of kigo
 Renga, an older form of poetry employing kigo
 Renku, the poetic form from which haiku derived, also using kigo

Japanese poetry
Haikai forms
Japanese literary terminology
Kigo